Probithia exclusa is a moth of the family Geometridae. It is found in the north-eastern Himalaya, Sri Lanka, the Philippines, Sulawesi and Sundaland.

Description
Its wingspan is about 40–46 mm. Both sexes colored. Forewings with a dark lunule on the costa at the postmedial series of specks.=, which is then very oblique and continued on hindwing as an antemedial line. Hindwings with the series of specks medial instead of postmedial. Outer margin of hindwings angled at vein 4 and non-crenulate. Ventral side ochreous, with the markings prominent, rufous, and with waved postmedial and submarginal bands.

Larvae have been reared on Eugenia species.

Subspecies
Probithia exclusa exclusa (north-eastern Himalaya, Philippines, Sulawesi)
Probithia exclusa lignaria (Sundaland)

References

External links
Digital Moths of Japan

Ennominae